Raña is a Spanish surname. Notable people with this surname include:

 Iván Raña Fuentes (born 1979), Spanish triathlete
 Mario Vázquez Raña (1932-2015), Mexican businessman
 Olegario Vázquez Raña (born 1935), Mexican entrepreneur and principal shareholder of Grupo Empresarial Ángeles

See also
 Rana (name)

Spanish-language surnames